The 2023 NWSL Draft presented by Ally was the eleventh annual meeting of National Women's Soccer League (NWSL) franchises to select amateur players above the age of 18 playing in the United States who exhausted, lost, or renounced any remaining collegiate eligibility, as well as select players that the NWSL had already signed in advance. It was held on January 12, 2023, at the 2023 United Soccer Coaches Convention in Philadelphia and covered by various linear and online platforms of CBS Sports.

Angel City FC selected Alyssa Thompson of the Harvard-Westlake School with the first overall pick. She was the first player ever to be picked in an NWSL draft directly out of high school.

Format 
 All 12 teams of the National Women's Soccer League (NWSL) took turns making their selections over four rounds. Draft order in each round was determined by the reverse order of the final 2022 regular season standings, except that the 2022 champions picked last and the runners-up picked second-to-last in each round.
 The list of players eligible for selection was released on January 10, 2023.
 CBS Sports covered the draft on various platforms, including CBS Sports Network, Paramount+, and CBS Sports HQ. International broadcast was available on the NWSL's YouTube channel.

Results

Picks

Trades
Round 1:

Round 2:

Round 3:

Round 4:

Summary
In 2023, a total of 34 colleges had players selected. Of these, three had a player drafted to the NWSL for the first time: Arizona, Iowa State and New Mexico.

Schools with multiple draft selections

Selections by college athletic conference

Selections by position

Future draft trades
2024 NWSL Draft trades
Round 1, Angel City FC → Orlando Pride. Orlando Pride acquired the natural first-round pick in the 2024 NWSL Draft, $75,000 in allocation money, and additional allocation money pending conditions met from Angel City FC in exchange for Sydney Leroux.
Round 1, Houston Dash → North Carolina Courage. North Carolina Courage acquired the No. 8 pick in the 2023 NWSL Draft, the natural first-round pick in the 2024 NWSL Draft, a 2023 international spot, and $100,000 in allocation money from Houston Dash in exchange for Diana Ordoñez and the No. 30 pick in the 2023 NWSL Draft.
Round 1, OL Reign → Washington Spirit. Washington Spirit acquired the natural first-round pick in the 2024 NWSL Draft and the No. 32 pick of the 2023 NWSL Draft from OL Reign in exchange for Emily Sonnett.
Round 2, Angel City FC → Portland Thorns FC. Portland Thorns FC acquired the natural second-round pick in the 2024 NWSL Draft, the No. 5 pick in the 2023 NWSL Draft, and $200,000 in allocation money from Angel City FC in exchange for Yazmeen Ryan.
Round 2, San Diego Wave FC → Orlando Pride. Orlando Pride acquired the natural second-round pick in the 2024 NWSL Draft and $150,000 in allocation money from San Diego Wave FC in exchange for Taylor Kornieck and the rights to Emily van Egmond.
Round 2 (conditional), Houston Dash → North Carolina Courage. North Carolina Courage acquired a conditional second-round pick in the 2024 NWSL Draft and $25,000 in allocation money from North Carolina Courage in exchange for Valérie Gauvin.
Round 3, Houston Dash → Portland Thorns FC. Portland Thorns FC acquired the natural third-round pick of the 2024 NWSL Draft and $10,000 in allocation money from Houston Dash in exchange for the No. 48 pick of the 2023 NWSL Draft.
Round 3, OL Reign → Chicago Red Stars. Chicago Red Stars acquired the natural third-round pick in the 2024 NWSL Draft, a 2023 international slot, and the No. 23 pick of the 2023 NWSL Draft from OL Reign in exchange for the No. 19 pick of the 2023 NWSL Draft.
Round 4, Orlando Pride → NJ/NY Gotham FC. NJ/NY Gotham FC acquired the natural fourth-round pick in the 2024 NWSL Draft and the No. 2 pick of the 2023 NWSL Draft from the Orlando Pride, pending conditions met, in exchange for $350,000 in allocation money. The conditions were met on January 7, 2023, when Alyssa Thompson declared for the 2023 NWSL Draft.

See also
 List of drafts held by the NWSL
 List of National Women's Soccer League draftees by college team

References

External links
 

National Women's Soccer League drafts
College Draft
NWSL College Draft
NWSL College Draft
Soccer in Pennsylvania
Sports in Philadelphia
Events in Philadelphia
NWSL College Draft